Pachymenia is a genus of cavibelonian solenogaster, a kind of shell-less, worm-like, marine mollusk.

Species
 Pachymenia abyssorum Heath, 1911

References

External links
 Heath, H. 1911. Reports on the scientifics results of the expeditions to the tropical Pacific, XIV. The Solenogastres. Mem. Mus. Comp. Zool. Harvard Coll., 45(1): 1-182

Solenogastres